Adrián Makala (born 1975), birth name Adrian Berthram McCalla Rivera, also known as "Makala", is a Mexican actor born in Mexico City. He has appeared in the Motion picture film Of Original Sin and the telenovela Mar de Amor on Televisa and the TV series "Los Simuladores" for Sony Entertainment Television. He attended various acting schools in Mexico City.

References
Fuerte.Verónica Bastos se codea en México con los grandes del … La Nación Costa Rica - August 15, 2006
 Ponen toque cubano a 'Bésame mucho' . El Universal - El Universal (México) - July 12, 2006
 Lorena Herrera le pide a Federico Díaz que se ponga a trabajar  El Sol de San Luis - June 30, 2008
Millaray Viera conquistó rápidamente México Canal13.cl - August 16, 2006

External links

Mexican male television actors
Mexican television presenters
Male actors from Mexico City
Mexican people of Scottish descent
1975 births
Living people
20th-century Mexican male actors
21st-century Mexican male actors